Bayles Shipyard is a historic shipyard located at Port Jefferson in Suffolk County, New York. It includes the 1897 Bayles Chandlery, the 1917 Machine Shop and Mould Loft and the 1917 Compressor House. The vicinity also contained a Mobil Oil Terminal.

It was added to the National Register of Historic Places in 2000. The machine shop and mould loft is currently used as the Port Jefferson Village Center. The former Mobil Oil terminal was converted into the Jeanne Garant Harborfront Park in 2004.

References

External links
 The Historical Society of Greater Port Jefferson
 Port Jefferson Village Center

Industrial buildings and structures on the National Register of Historic Places in New York (state)
Industrial buildings completed in 1897
Port Jefferson, New York
Buildings and structures in Suffolk County, New York
National Register of Historic Places in Suffolk County, New York
Shipyards of New York (state)
Transportation buildings and structures in Suffolk County, New York
Transportation buildings and structures on the National Register of Historic Places in New York (state)